This page shows the results of the Canoeing Competition for men and women at the 2003 Pan American Games, held from August 1 to August 17, 2003, in Santo Domingo, Dominican Republic.

Men's competition

K1 500 m

K2 500 m

K1 1,000 m

K2 1,000 m

K4 1,000 m

C1 500 m

C2 500 m

C1 1,000 m

C2 1,000 m

Women's competition

K1 500 m

K2 500 m

K4 500 m

Medal table

See also
 Canoeing at the 2004 Summer Olympics

References
 Sports 123

P
2003
Events at the 2003 Pan American Games
Canoeing in the Dominican Republic